Butamirate (or brospamin, trade names Acodeen, Codesin, Pertix, Sinecod, Sinecoden, Sinecodix) is a cough suppressant. It has been marketed in Europe and Mexico, but not in the United States.

As the citrate salt, it is sold in the form of lozenges, syrup, tablets, dragées, or pastilles. Adverse effects can include nausea, diarrhea, vertigo, and exanthema.

Pharmacology
A study found it to bind to the cough center in the medulla oblongata, more specifically the dextromethorphan-binding site in guinea pig brain with high affinity.

As a 2-(2-diethylaminoethoxy)ethyl ester, it is chemically related to oxeladin and pentoxyverine, which are in the same class. (Oxeladin has an additional ethyl group in its carboxylic acid, pentoxyverine has both ethyl groups of oxeladin replaced by one cyclopentyl in the same place.)

See also 
 Cough syrup
 Noscapine
 Codeine; Pholcodine
 Dextromethorphan; Dimemorfan
 Racemorphan; Dextrorphan; Levorphanol
 Pentoxyverine
 Tipepidine
 Cloperastine; Levocloperastine

References 

Antitussives
Diethylamino compounds
Carboxylate esters
Ethers